is a train station located in Dazaifu, Fukuoka.

Lines 
Nishi-Nippon Railroad
Dazaifu Line

Surrounding 
Dazaifu city office

Adjacent stations 

|-
|colspan=5 style="text-align:center;" |Nishi-Nippon Railroad

References

Railway stations in Fukuoka Prefecture
Buildings and structures in Dazaifu, Fukuoka
Railway stations in Japan opened in 1927